Sompeta is a census town in Srikakulam district of the Indian state of Andhra Pradesh. It is the mandal headquarters of Sompeta mandal in Tekkali revenue division.

Geography
It has an average elevation of 8 metres (26 feet).

Demographics
Sompeta is a Census Town city in district of Srikakulam, Andhra Pradesh. The Sompeta Census Town has population of 18,778 of which 8,968 are males while 9,810 are females as per report released by Census India 2011.

Population of Children with age of 0-6 is 1822 which is 9.70% of total population of Sompeta (CT). In Sompeta Census Town, Female Sex Ratio is of 1094 against state average of 993. Moreover Child Sex Ratio in Sompeta is around 947 compared to Andhra Pradesh state average of 939. Literacy rate of Sompeta city is 76.23% higher than state average of 67.02%. In Sompeta, Male literacy is around 84.55% while female literacy rate is 68.75%.

Sompeta Census Town has total administration over 4,605 houses to which it supplies basic amenities like water and sewerage. It is also authorized to build roads within Census Town limits and impose taxes on properties coming under its jurisdiction.

Assembly constituency
Sompeta was an Assembly Constituency in Andhra Pradesh. However, Sompeta Assembly Constituency ceases to exist as an assembly constituency as per the delimitation process recently carried out. Part of the constituency includes Sompeta mandal will be part of Ichchapuram Assembly Constituency. The other part makes into the newly formed Palasa Assembly Constituency.
Smt. Chitrada Nagaratnam is Sarpanch of the Town. Chitrada Srinivasa Rao is present MPP of Sompeta .

List of elected members:

1951, 1955, 1962, 1967 and 1978 - Gouthu Latchanna
1972 - Majji Thulasi Das.
1983 - Majji Narayana Rao
1985, 1989, 1994, 1999 and 2004 - Syama Sundara Sivaji
2009 - Piria Sairaj
2014,2019- Bendalam Ashok

Education
The primary and secondary school education is imparted by government, aided and private schools, under the School Education Department of the state. The medium of instruction followed by different schools are English, Telugu.

References

External links 
 Samapa: Or the Asokan Kalinga
 Someta Mandal Village List

Census towns in Andhra Pradesh
Mandal headquarters in Srikakulam district